Esther Mbabazi is a professional commercial airline pilot in Rwanda, a member country of the East African Community. She is the first female in Rwanda to become certified as a commercial airline pilot. She flies for RwandAir, the national airline of Rwanda.

Background and education
She was born in Burundi circa 1988, to Rwandese parents. Her father and mother are revivalist pastors and the family moved around a lot. When Esther was about eight years, her father died in a plane crash when the aircraft he was travelling in overshot the runway while landing in neighboring Democratic Republic of the Congo. The family moved back to Rwanda in 1996. She trained at the East African Civil Aviation Academy in Uganda, before RwandAir sponsored her to continue her training in Miami, Florida.

Career
On completion of her studies in the United States, Esther Mbabazi was hired by RwandAir to fly as a co-pilot on the Boeing 737 and on the CRJ900, beginning in 2012, when she was 24 years old.

See also
 Irene Koki Mutungi
 Geraldine Waruguru
 Aluel James Bol

References

External links
 Website of Rwandair
 Rwanda's First Female Pilot

1988 births
Living people
Women aviators
People from Kigali
Rwandan aviators
Commercial aviators
East African Civil Aviation Academy alumni
Women commercial aviators